Rhipidarctia subminiata is a moth in the family Erebidae. It was described by Sergius G. Kiriakoff in 1959. It is found in the Democratic Republic of the Congo.

References

Moths described in 1959
Syntomini